Yusuf Muritala Adewunmi (born 5 November 1982) is a German former professional footballer who played as defensive midfielder.

Career
Adewunmi was born in Hamburg.

He made eight appearances in the Nemzeti Bajnokság I for the Honved Budapest.

Personal life
Yusuf is the brother of Akeem Adewunmi, a player agent and a former footballer.

References

Living people
1982 births
German footballers
Nigerian footballers
Footballers from Hamburg
Association football midfielders
Regionalliga players
Slovak Super Liga players
Nemzeti Bajnokság I players
FC St. Pauli players
Eimsbütteler TV players
Hamburger SV II players
Fortuna Düsseldorf players
FC Petržalka players
Budapest Honvéd FC players
Bremer SV players
FC Oberneuland players
TuS Dassendorf players
German people of Yoruba descent
German expatriate sportspeople in Slovakia
Expatriate footballers in Slovakia
German expatriate sportspeople in Hungary
Expatriate footballers in Hungary
German sportspeople of Nigerian descent
Yoruba sportspeople